Peterson Joseph (born 24 April 1990) is a Haitian professional footballer.

Known for having a soft touch on the ball and playing with quick one to two touch passes throughout the field, Joseph is known as the "Haitian Xavi".

Club career
Joseph played for Haitian League side Aigle Noir AC before moving to Portuguese side SC Braga in the European mid-season transfer window. Joseph had a year-long loan spell with SC Braga's affiliate team FC Vizela, who were playing in the Portuguese Second Division at the time. Joseph was a member of the team that made it to the final of the UEFA Europa League.

Joseph joined Major League Soccer club Sporting Kansas City on September 1, 2011 and made his initial appearance with the club on October 1, 2011 in the 83rd minute against the San Jose Earthquakes. In 2012, he was a member of the team that won the U.S. Open Cup. A year later, he won the 2013 MLS Championship. He stayed with the club for three years in total before his contract was terminated on August 11, 2014.

After unsuccessful trials in Tanzania and Malaysia, he signed with Delhi Premier League club Sudeva Moonlight on October 1, 2016.

International career
Joseph played for Haiti at the 2007 CONCACAF U17 Tournament and the 2007 FIFA U-17 World Cup, before making his debut for the full senior Haitiian national team in 2008. Joseph appear in 2010 FIFA World Cup Qualifier, Caribbean Cup 2012, Gold Cup 2013 and friendlies apparitions on numerous occasions.

References

External links
 
 Player profile – Haitiwebs.com
 

1990 births
Living people
Haitian footballers
Haitian expatriate footballers
Haiti international footballers
S.C. Braga players
F.C. Vizela players
Sporting Kansas City players
Expatriate footballers in Portugal
Expatriate soccer players in the United States
Primeira Liga players
Major League Soccer players
2013 CONCACAF Gold Cup players
Association football midfielders
Haitian expatriate sportspeople in India